Andy Hardy Comes Home is a 1958 comedy film directed by Howard W. Koch. It is the 16th and final film in the Andy Hardy series, with Mickey Rooney reprising his signature role. It was produced 12 years after the previous Hardy film, and was an attempt to revive what had once been an enormously popular film series. Because the film fell short of box office projections, Metro-Goldwyn-Mayer did not resume the series.

Plot
Returning to his hometown of Carvel after several years' absence, Andrew "Andy" Hardy, now a high-flying West Coast lawyer, reminiscences (in flashbacks to earlier films) about his past. He also reconnects with his mother, aunt, sister, and nephew Jimmy as he attempts to convince the skeptical townsfolk to let his company build a factory there.

When his plan to buy land from his old friend Beezy runs into difficulty, Andy brings his wife, Jane, and two children, Andy Jr. and Cricket, to bolster his resolve, and to help him live up to the lessons instilled in him by his late father.

While all seems lost, the closing moments reposition the resurrected series for a new set of Andy Hardy films, but these never materialized.

Cast

 Mickey Rooney as Andy Hardy
 Patricia Breslin as Jane Hardy
 Fay Holden as Mrs. Emily Hardy
 Cecilia Parker as Marian Hardy
 Sara Haden as Aunt Milly Forrest
 Joey Forman as Beezy "Beez" Anderson
 Jerry Colonna as Doc
 Vaughn Taylor as Thomas Chandler
 Frank Ferguson as Mayor Benson
 William Leslie as Jack Bailey
 Tom Duggan as Councilman Warren
 Jeanne Baird as Sally Anderson
 Gina Gillespie as Cricket Hardy
 Jimmy Bates as Chuck
 Teddy Rooney as Andrew "Andy" Hardy, Jr.
 Johnny Weissmuller, Jr. as Jimmy
 Pat Cawley as Betty Wilson

Production
Songwriter Robert Donley and journalist Edward Hushting wrote an original Andy Hardy synopsis on speculation and brought it to Rooney's agent, Red Doff. He showed it to Rooney, who was enthusiastic, and they pitched the project to Metro-Goldwyn-Mayer as a co-production with Rooney's own company, Fryman Enterprises. The studio, then under the control of Joseph Vogel, agreed to make the film.

"We feel it's time for another Hardy picture", said Doff. "Time for a good, warm, wholesome family comedy – no violence, no monsters, no sex! There are millions who have seen and loved the Hardys – and who would like to see them again. And there are millions who never saw them on the big screen, but who are being presold by seeing them on TV. People like things nostalgic. We believe they'll be curious to see a re-creation of what they loved 15 and 20 years ago."
  
Lewis Stone, who had played the beloved Judge James Hardy in the previous films, had died in 1953 and his character's passing was portrayed in the film. Fay Holden, Sara Haden, and Cecilia Parker all reprised their roles of Emily Hardy, Aunt Milly and Marian, respectively. (Parker had mostly retired from acting since the previous film in 1947, devoting herself to raising her children).

Mickey Rooney tried to persuade Ann Rutherford to return as Polly Benedict, Andy's on-and-off sweetheart in most of the original movies, so the two characters could be a married couple, but Rutherford's salary demands were too high, and the character was written out. Andy's wife in the film, Jane (played by Patricia Breslin), had no prior connection to the town of Carvel.

In line with MGM's practice of introducing studio contract players in the series, contractee Pat Cawley was given a role.

The role of Andy Hardy Jr. was played by Rooney's real-life son, Teddy.

Filming began on 7 May 1958.  The film premiered on 22 December 1958 in New York City.

Reception
According to MGM records, the movie earned $400,000 in the US and Canada and $210,000 elsewhere, making a loss to the studio of $5,000.

Before the film was released, Hutshing and Donley worked on a sequel about Andy Hardy as a judge called Andy Hardy Carries On. There was also some talk of an Andy Hardy TV series. In the early 1960s, a pilot was shot for a prospective Andy Hardy sitcom for NBC, with a totally different cast and with the character of Judge Hardy returning, but NBC did not pick it up as a series.

See also
 List of American films of 1958

References

External links
 
 
 
 
 Andy Hardy Comes Home at Andy Hardy Films

1958 films
1958 comedy films
American comedy films
American black-and-white films
Films directed by Howard W. Koch
Metro-Goldwyn-Mayer films
1950s English-language films
1950s American films